Claire de Gubernatis was the defending champion, but chose not to participate.

Arantxa Rus won the title, defeating Sesil Karatantcheva in the final, 6–4, 6–1.

Seeds

Main draw

Finals

Top half

Bottom half

References
 Main Draw*

The Oaks Club Challenger - Singles